Joakim Waskar Olañeta Borda-Pedreira (born in 1977 in Malmö) is a Swedish-Bolivian art historian, art critic and curator naturalised in Norway. He grew up in Lund and studied law, philosophy and art history at Lund University, Goldsmith's college, London, and Oslo University, specialising in European Modernism and Spanish Colonial Art. He was Art Editor of Plaza Magazine (2007-2011), Stockholm, and is the Founding Director of The Boiler Room Gallery in Oslo. Between 2012-2015 he was Head Curator of The Arts Festival of North Norway. He has since been Director of several art institutions in Norway, such as the Association of Art Centres in Norway (KIN) and Gallery Format Oslo. In the end of 2017 he was appointed Director of RAM Gallery in Oslo for the tenure of 2018–2021. Borda-Pedreira is son of the Swedish professor of ethnology Beatriz Lindqvist and was grandson of the Bolivian poet and member of parliament Hector Borda Leaño.

In 2017, Borda-Pedreira co-founded Nordic Institute of Art, a non-profit institution dedicated to promoting art history, together with his husband, Norwegian Art Historian Knut Ljøgodt.

References

1977 births
Living people
Swedish art historians
Bolivian art historians
Bolivian writers